CAUP may refer to:
 Tongji University College of Architecture and Urban Planning
 University of Washington College of Architecture and Urban Planning
 Centre for Astrophysics of the University of Porto